Dr. Akanimo Odon is an international business and strategy development expert from Nigeria. He specializes in education and training, energy and environment, oil and gas, media, charities and government. He is the African Advisor for Lancaster University and University of London. He lives in England and he is the CEO of Envirofly Consulting Limited, co-founder of Xn Foundation and also the founder of Flexy-Learn and Academia for Green Africa Initiative.

Odon is a poet, novelist and an award-winning author. He is the creator of the Programme for the Internationalization of Education (PIE), an international initiative designed to increase the international impact of education in Africa, and also creator of one of the most comprehensive and UK CPD certified suite of online career programme in Africa, the Career Enhancement Programme Online (CEPO).

Education 
Odon studied Zoology at the University of Benin (1998–2002). After his National Youth Service Corps (NYSC) in Nigeria, he got a scholarship to pursue his master's degree in the UK. He got a master's degree in Environmental Rehabilitation at the University of Wales, Aberystwyth, UK (2003–2004) and further went for his PhD in Environmental Management at Lancaster University, UK (2004–2007).

In 2007, Odon got an Enterprise Development Certificate from the University of Cambridge Judge Business School/MIT and an Enterprise Fellowship Certificate from Stanford University Graduate School of Business in 2007.

Career 

Odon was an International Ambassador for Lancaster University where he was an adviser to the British Government on developing international education policies under the National Student Forum. He was also an Education Partnership Consultant for the British Council, Nigeria.

Odon was a Business Development Consultant for the Grow Creative Scheme under the European Regional Development Fund (ERDF) and an Africa Adviser for several African and UK organizations.

He was appointed the African Strategy Adviser for Lancaster Environment Centre. He worked as a Consultant for the National Centre for Energy and Environment, Nigeria and was appointed an editorial board member for the first International Journal on Energy and Environment in West Africa.

He has held various consultant positions around different countries in Africa. He was the strategy consultant for the National Centre for Energy and Environment under the Energy Commission of the Presidency of Nigeria, and the Nigerian Liquefied Natural Gas on capacity building. He was the Technical Adviser for Lagos State Ministry of Environment; Non-Resident Research Fellow of the African Centre for Technological Studies, Kenya; Adviser for Africa Centre for Energy Policy in Ghana; Consultant for Trust Africa Senegal, reviewing capacity building policies in Nigeria, Mali, Botswana, Ethiopia, Ghana, Gabon and Egypt; Adviser to the National Social Security Fund (NSSF) Tanzania; and Local Content Consultant to the African Development Bank.

He has held the position of the African Strategy Advisor for Aberystwyth University, University of Strathclyde, and University of East Anglia. He is currently the African Regional Advisor for the University of London and Lancaster University. Also, he is serving as the African director for Zurich Elite Business School, Switzerland. He is also serving as the Africa Advisor on the 7 million pounds UK Government Global Challenge Research Fund (GCRF) Lancaster University RECIRCULATE project whose focus is to build capacity for a circular water economy in six African countries.

He has authored several books and was the line producer for the film Dry.

Dr. Odon is the founder of Lancaster International, an international outreach school supporting primary and secondary schools in Africa with its headquarter in Nigeria.

He is a visiting Professor to Strathmore University, Kenya and Igbinedion University, Nigeria. Over the years, he has organized international workshops and conferences, partnered with government, industries and academia in over 30 African countries. He has also developed over 100 strategic educational, research and commercial partnerships between the UK and some African organizations and mentored over 5,000 young African researchers.

Awards 
Odon has won several awards, some include DFID Scholarship Award, the British Council best UK international student Shine Award 2006, Stanford University REE Fellowship Award and the Young Entrepreneurs Scheme (YES) Award in a programme sponsored by BBSRC, Unilever, BIA, Lonza and a host of other reputable companies.

He has been awarded with the Public Service Award and Nigerian Centenary Award Committee: One of the Most Influential Nigerians in the Diaspora (2015).

Personal life 
Odon is married to Ifeyinwa Odon. They have two children - a daughter, Kaela and a son, Kanaan. The family resides in Lancaster, UK.

References

External links 
 of Akanimo Odon
 of Envirofly Groups
 of Xn Foundation

People from Lancaster, Lancashire
Living people
Nigerian film producers
University of Benin (Nigeria) alumni
Alumni of Lancaster University
Year of birth missing (living people)
Nigerian businesspeople
Alumni of the University of Wales
Nigerian writers
English businesspeople
English chief executives
Stanford University fellows
Nigerian chief executives